The Treaty of Novgorod was concluded in August 1561, during the Livonian War, between Sweden and the Tsardom of Russia. It settled the common border, with Reval (Tallinn) submitted to Swedish rule since June, revised the truce established in the Treaty of Novgorod (1557) and renewed in early 1561 to last twenty years.  The treaty was renewed and extended by the Treaty of Dorpat (1564).

Sources

External links
Scan of the treaty (IEG Mainz)

Livonian War
Treaties of the Swedish Empire
Novgorod (1561)
History of Tallinn
History of Veliky Novgorod
1561 treaties
1561 in Russia
Russia–Sweden treaties